Super Magic Brothers is a football club based in Victoria, Seychelles. Until 2008, the team was called Seychelles Marketing Board (the name of a government parastatal company). They were relegated to the 2nd Division in November 2009.

Performance in CAF competitions
CAF Confederation Cup: 1 appearance
2006 – Preliminary Round

Current squad

Football clubs in Seychelles

Organizations with year of establishment missing